Acacia delibrata is a perennial shrub or tree growing to 9m in height, with a distinctive "minni ritchi" bark, flowering from April to June and in October. It is native to tropical Western Australia. It is not listed as being a threatened species.
A crude saponin solution in water, prepared from the seed pods of a tree believed to be this species, was found to be severely irritant when applied to the eyes of a dog.

See also
List of Acacia species

References 

delibrata
Trees of Australia
Fabales of Australia
Acacias of Western Australia
Taxa named by George Bentham